Plioplatecarpus is a genus of mosasaur lizard. Like all mosasaurs, it lived in the late Cretaceous period, about 73-68 million years ago.

Discovery

Plioplatecarpus has been found in many locations around the world (most mosasaurs were fairly widespread). Plioplatecarpus has been found in  the Pierre Shale of Kansas, Demopolis Chalk of Alabama, and also in Mississippi, North Dakota, South Dakota, Canada, Sweden, The Netherlands. It was first found in Europe by paleontologist Louis Dollo (P. marshi), in 1882. It was relatively incomplete, but more fossils would soon turn up. In North America, Edward Drinker Cope found another mosasaur in 1869, but had identified it as Mosasaurus. It would later be reclassified as Plioplatecarpus, as would Cope's Liodon, in 1870. Liodon would be reclassified as Platecarpus, and later as Prognathodon or this genus.

Possible freshwater occurrence
In 1999, Holmes and colleagues described an incomplete specimen of Plioplatecarpus from a non-marine deposit, suggesting that this genus might have entered freshwater and estuarine habitats. While the describers of Pannoniasaurus considered this as 'a stochastic occurrence with no ecological implications', Taylor and colleagues in 2021 considered that this specimen and Pannoniasaurus directly support 'mosasaur inhabitation of coastal and river environments'.

Description
 
The eyes of Plioplatecarpus are proportionally larger than those of many mosasaur genera, although the skull is relatively short. The larger eyes may be an adaptation to low light conditions like those found in deeper water. It has fewer teeth than most mosasaurs, but they are greatly recurved. This suggests that Plioplatecarpus would have hunted relatively small prey that it could grab very precisely. The broad distribution of fossil remains in both North America and Europe suggest that it would have been an open ocean predator.

References

Russellosaurins
Mosasaurs of North America
Mosasaurs of Europe
Fossil taxa described in 1882
Taxa named by Louis Dollo
Demopolis Chalk
Maastrichtian genera